Randy Dionisius Pangalila (born 19 October 1990) is an Indonesian actor. He is known for his role as Tristan in the Indonesian soap opera Cinta Fitri.

Randy is the second child of Belle Pangalila and Lisa Pangalila. He is of Manado, Dutch, and Javanese descent.

Randy married Canadian woman Chelsey Frank on 19 January 2019. Randy and Chelsey welcomed their first child, a daughter, on 24 March 2021.

Filmography

Film 
 Oh Baby (2008)
 Kutukan Suster Ngesot (2009)
 Saya Cinta, Bajingan (2009)
 Pasangan Romantis (2010)
 Tiga Cinta (2010)

Television 
 Alisha (soap opera) (2007)
 Gue Banget
 Dongeng (2007)
 Cinta Fitri Season 1, Season 3, and Season Ramadhan (2007–2009)
 Cinta Kirana (2008)
 Chelsea (2008)
 Karissa (2008)
 I Love You (2009)
 Sumpah I Luv U (2009)
 Hafizah (2009–2010)
 Putih Merah (2010)
 Cinta Melody (2010)
 Cinta Piano
 Nada Cinta (2011)
 Kian 1,2,3
 Biar Mimpi Sampai Ke Bintang (2011) – With Malaysian actress 
 Aishiteru (2011)
 Si Miskin & Si Kaya
 Dalam Hati Ada Taman – With Malaysian actress (Elfira Loy) (2012)
 Raja Dan Aku (2012)
 Benci vs Cinta – With Malaysian Actress (Nora Danish)
 Urusan hati Cik Drama Queen  (2017)

 Discography 
 Lewat Semesta Tanpamu Ku Tak Bisa Everything I Need Selalu Milikmu'' – With Malaysian Actress (Marsha Milan Londoh)

References

External links 
 

Living people
Indonesian male film actors
Indonesian male television actors
1990 births